The Edo prison break was an attack on the federal prison at Oko in Benin City, the capital of Edo State in southern Nigeria by unknown gunmen suspected to be Armed robbers in a bid to rescue their members who are largely condemn inmates. About 12 prisoners escaped from the prison.

Incident
The incident occurred on Sunday 19 August 2012. It was reported than an explosive was used in the attack by the criminals to blown off the prison gate, a claim refuted by the Edo state commissioner of police, Olayinka Balogun.
No death or severe injuries were recorded from the attack.

See also
List of prison breaks in Nigeria

References

Crime in Nigeria
Prison escapes
2012 crimes in Nigeria
Benin City
Escapees from Nigerian detention
August 2012 events in Nigeria